James Alfred Cullimore (January 17, 1906 – June 14, 1986) was a general authority of the Church of Jesus Christ of Latter-day Saints (LDS Church) from 1966 until his death.

Cullimore was born in Lindon, Utah. From 1925 to 1927, he was a LDS Church missionary in California. He received a bachelor's degree from Brigham Young University, where he was student body president, and a master's degree from New York University.

After completing his education, Cullimore opened a retail furniture store in Oklahoma City, Oklahoma. He was a branch president and district president in Oklahoma before becoming the first president of the LDS Church's Oklahoma Stake on October 23, 1960. After just a few weeks in this position, he was called to be the president of the church's Central British Mission.

In April 1966, Cullimore became an Assistant to the Quorum of the Twelve Apostles. When this position was abolished in 1976, he became a member of the First Quorum of the Seventy. In 1978, Cullimore was granted general authority emeritus status.

Cullimore died in Salt Lake City, Utah. He was the father of three children.

References
“Elder James A. Cullimore Dies,” Ensign, August 1986, pp. 74–75
2005 Deseret News Church Almanac (Salt Lake City, Utah: Deseret News, 2004) p. 79

External links
Grampa Bill's G.A. Pages: James A. Cullimore

1906 births
1986 deaths
20th-century Mormon missionaries
American Mormon missionaries in England
American Mormon missionaries in the United States
Assistants to the Quorum of the Twelve Apostles
Brigham Young University alumni
Members of the First Quorum of the Seventy (LDS Church)
Mission presidents (LDS Church)
New York University alumni
People from Oklahoma City
People from Lindon, Utah
American general authorities (LDS Church)
Latter Day Saints from Oklahoma
Latter Day Saints from Utah